Dominik Meffert was the defending champion but decided not to participate.
Tatsuma Ito won the title, defeating Malek Jaziri 6–7(5–7), 6–1, 6–2 in the final.

Seeds

Draw

Finals

Top half

Bottom half

References
 Main Draw
 Qualifying Draw

All Japan Indoor Tennis Championships - Singles
2012 Singles